The Silent War is a 2019 Spanish war film written and directed by Alfonso Cortés-Cavanillas. The cast is led by Asier Etxeandia, Marian Álvarez, Hugo Silva, Aitor Luna, Olimpia Melinte and Imanol Arias.

Plot 
Set in 1944 Spain, the plot features a guerrilla fighter (maquis) who becomes deaf and has to survive a manhunt.

Cast

Production 
It consists of an adaptation of the graphic novel Sordo by David Múñoz and Rayco Pulido. The film was written by the director alongside Juan Carlos Díaz Martín.

Release 
The Silent War was presented at the 22nd Málaga Film Festival (FCME) on March 22, 2019, as part of the festival's official selection. Distributed by Filmax, the film was theatrically released in Spain on September 13, 2019.

Netflix released the film on its streaming service on February 3, 2020.

See also
 List of Spanish films of 2019
 List of films featuring the deaf and hard of hearing

References

External links

The Connection Between ‘The Silent War’ and ‘For Whom the Bell Tolls’, Explained at The Cinemaholic

2019 films
2010s war films
Spanish war films
Films based on Spanish comics
Live-action films based on comics
Films about deaf people
Films set in 1944
Films set in Spain
Films about the Spanish Maquis
2010s Spanish films